Geba (lit. "the hill") was a city mentioned in the Hebrew Bible.

Biblical sources
It was a Kohanic and Levitical city located in the geographical territory of the Tribe of Benjamin on the northern border of Judah, adjacent to Ramah in Benjamin north of Gibeah.

During the wars in the time of Saul, Geba was held as a garrison by the Philistines, but they were ejected by Jonathan.

During the reigns of Asa, king of Judah and Baasha, king of Israel, Geba was one of two cities that Asa built up from the stones Baasha had used to fortify Ramah.

Location

According to Josephus, "Gabao" was located 50 stadia from Jerusalem, as one ascended by Bethoron. Geba has been identified with Jeba', about 5½ miles north of Jerusalem.

References

Hebrew Bible cities
Levitical cities
13 Kohanic cities
Cities of refuge